Barry Wade Stokes (born December 20, 1973) is a former American football offensive lineman of the National Football League (NFL). He was signed by the Detroit Lions as an undrafted free agent in 1996. He played college football at Eastern Michigan University.  He played high school football at Davison High School in Davison, Michigan.

Stokes has also been a member of the Jacksonville Jaguars, St. Louis Rams, Miami Dolphins, Green Bay Packers, Oakland Raiders, Cleveland Browns, New York Giants, Atlanta Falcons, and New England Patriots.

Professional career
Prior to playing for the Falcons, he was signed to the practice squad of several teams, but did not see NFL action until the 1998 NFL season with the Miami Dolphins.  He then played for the Green Bay Packers and Cleveland Browns, and was a member of the New York Giants but did not play due to back injuries.  He spent time in NFL Europe, where he played for the Scottish Claymores.

External links
Detroit Lions bio
Green Bay Packers bio
New England Patriots bio

1973 births
Living people
American football offensive guards
American football offensive tackles
Atlanta Falcons players
Cleveland Browns players
Detroit Lions players
Eastern Michigan Eagles football players
Green Bay Packers players
Jacksonville Jaguars players
Miami Dolphins players
New England Patriots players
New York Giants players
Oakland Raiders players
People from Davison, Michigan
Players of American football from Flint, Michigan
Scottish Claymores players
St. Louis Rams players